Thorvald Hansen can refer to:

 Thorvald Hansen (skier), Norwegian nordic combined skier
 Thorvald Hansen (composer) (1847-1915), Danish trumpeter and composer
 Thorvald Hansen (weightlifter) (1891-1961), Danish weightlifter